This is a list of J1 League transfers made during both winter and summer transfer windows of the 2023 season by each club. The winter transfer window will go from 6 January to 31 March, while the summer transfer window will go from 21 July to 18 August. Free agents will be allowed through 8 September.

Albirex Niigata

Avispa Fukuoka

Cerezo Osaka

Consadole Sapporo

Gamba Osaka

Kashima Antlers

Kashiwa Reysol

Kawasaki Frontale

Kyoto Sanga

Nagoya Grampus

Sagan Tosu

Sanfrecce Hiroshima

Shonan Bellmare

FC Tokyo

Urawa Red Diamonds

Vissel Kobe

Yokohama FC

Yokohama F. Marinos

See also
List of J2 League football transfers 2023
List of J3 League football transfers 2023
List of Japan Football League football transfers 2023

References

External links
J1 League 2023 Transfers
J.League News 
JFA/J.League 2022 DSPs to fully join the league on 2023

2023
Transfers